The vine-thicket fine-lined slider (Lerista cinerea)  is a species of skink found in Queensland, Australia.

References

Lerista
Reptiles described in 1983
Taxa named by Allen Eddy Greer
Taxa named by Keith R. McDonald (herpetologist)
Taxa named by Bruce C. Lawrie